Monetochka is the stage name of Elizaveta Andreevna Gyrdymova (born 1 June 1998), a Russian singer-songwriter.

Biography 
Gyrdymova was born on 1 June 1998 in Yekaterinburg. From childhood, Gyrdymova enjoyed writing poetry and published her work on the site Stihi.ru as a teenager.

In 2014, she entered tenth grade at the Specialized Educational and Scientific Center of the Ural Federal University. In 2016, she enrolled in correspondence courses in film production at the Gerasimov Institute of Cinematography in Moscow. She chose the school because of her love of classic cinema.

Since September 2016, Gyrdymova has continued her studies, and her first internship was at the ETV channel in her native Yekaterinburg, where she released joint projects with the poet Alexandra Aksyonova. She then worked for some time as a producer at ETV.

In May 2022, it became known that the singer left Russia for Lithuania.

In January 2023, the Russian Ministry of Justice included Gyrdymova in the list of foreign agents.

Musical career 

At the end of 2015, Gyrdymova uploaded her first album, Psychedelic Cloud-Rap, to the social network VKontakte under the pseudonym Monetochka. She recorded the songs at home on a synthesizer. Soon after, she began uploading videos of her live performances to YouTube.

On 22 January 2016, she officially released Psychedelic Cloud Rap. The album was posted in one of the popular social network communities and quickly went viral. By the end of February, she had over 20,000 followers on her VKontakte page and received offers to give concerts and interviews.

In January 2017, Monetochka released the video for the song "Ushla k realistu". On 1 June 2017 the video for the song "Childfree", recorded with Noize MC, was released. The song and video became the subject of a scandal. The Moscow lawyer Sergei Afanasyev wrote to the prosecutor's office to check "Childfree" for legal violations, claiming that the lyrics promoted teen suicide.

In 2017, Monetochka began to collaborate with the alternative R&B musician and producer Viktor "BTsKh" Isaev. Their first collaboration, the single "Poslednyaya diskoteka", was released on 31 October 2017.

On 25 May 2018, Monetochka released her first studio album, Coloring for Adults, produced by Isaev. According to the press release, Coloring for Adults marked a new sound for Monetochka, "containing musical references to the 1980s and 1990s, contemporary club music, music from cartoons, and even folklore." The album contains multiple references to the late Soviet rock musician Viktor Tsoi, including a musical quote from the Kino song "Khochu peremen!" and lyrics mentioning a "weary Tsoi".

On 28 May 2018, Monetochka performed the song "Kazhdyi raz" on the late-night talk show Evening Urgant. In his introduction, the host, Ivan Urgant, said that some critics considered Monetochka's new album "one of the major Russian-language albums of this year." On 1 June 2018, a concert presentation of the new album took place in Moscow.

On 2 October 2020, Monetochka released the studio album Arts and Crafts.

In 2022, Monetochka toured with Noize MC, raising over €200,000 for a Polish charity that helped refugees resulting from the Russian invasion of Ukraine.

Critical reception 
In a review of Psychedelic Cloud Rap on the InterMedia website, the music critic Alexei Mazhaev wrote that "in Liza's music, stiob is combined with sanity on the verge of cynicism", and "excellent command of words, a sense of language and accurate orientation in the signs of the times are seasoned with charming naivety."

According to music journalist Alexander Gorbachev (Meduza), despite the fact that Monetochka started off as an Internet meme, she did not share the formulaic path of short-lived celebrity. Comparing the singer's songs from Psychedelic Cloud Rap to the new songs of Coloring for Adults, Gorbachev notes that "the toylike childishness of Monetochka’s early music has grown into something far more complex in this album."

The poet Vera Polozkova spoke about Monetochka's success in the following way: “This is absolutely a child telling you about what is happening around you, with such irreconcilability which you would never have dared to use yourself."

Maria Engström claims that "Monetochka’s album [Coloring for Adults] today is the only intelligible manifesto of the aesthetics of Putin’s fourth term in office."

The singer Zemfira called Monetochka's lyrics "excellent", but said she considered the singer's voice "repulsive".

Boris Barabanov named "Kazhdyi raz" one of the 16 top songs of 2018 and wrote that by releasing Coloring for Adults, Monetochka "managed to break the framework of the independent scene and break into the mainstream."

Childfree and accusations of promoting suicide 

On June 28, 2018, Moscow lawyer Sergei Afanasyev said that the prosecutor's office, at his request, began checking the song "Childfree" of Monetochka and Noize MC for, in his view, calls for adolescent suicide in the song, specifically in the following lyrics:

Vitaly Milonov, a deputy from United Russia, was also extremely outraged by this work and said in an interview that medical experiments should be carried out on Monetochka and Noize MC.

However, many famous people defended the performers, stating that one cannot judge the entire composition by a phrase taken out of context. For example, Mikhail Osadchiy, Vice-Rector for Science of the State Institute of Russian Language, spoke as follows:

Charts 
In December 2016, Monetochka's track "Gosha Rubchinskiy" was ranked 11th in The Flow's "50 Best Tracks of 2016."

In January 2017, Psychedelic Cloud Rap was ranked 6th in The Flow's "33 Best Russian Albums of 2016". Psychedelic Cloud Rap was 14th in the list of the 20 best Russian albums in Afisha Daily's "40 Albums of the Year" for 2016. In December 2017, "Poslednyaya diskoteka" was ranked 17th in The Flow's "50 Best Tracks of 2017."

In 2018, at the Jager Music Awards, Monetochka won in the categories "Group of the Year" and "Single of the Year" with the song "Kazhdyi raz". All 10 songs from Coloring for Adults entered Yandex Music's Top 100 chart within three days of the album's release. The song "Nimfomanka" received the highest ranking, reaching number one in the chart. In summing up the music of 2018, Yandex Music named Monetochka as the breakthrough artist of the year and noted that "Kazhdyi raz" was one of the most streamed tracks across their markets. The Flow ranked Monetochka's tracks "90" and "Kazhdyi raz" in the 20th and first places, respectively, in their list of the 50 best tracks of 2018, and according to the results of a popular vote, Coloring for Adults came third among the best albums of 2018 and first among pop albums of the year.

Discography

Albums 

 2016 — Psychedelic Cloud Rap
 2018 — Coloring for Adults
 2020 — Arts and Crafts

Mini-albums 

 2017 — I'm Liza

Singles 

 2016 — "Gosha Rubchinskiy"
 2016 — "Capital"
 2016 — "Trump Ace"
 2016 — "Left for a Realist"
 2016 — "Factory"
 2016 — "Hello, Angelina"
 2017 — "Daddy, forgive me"
 2017 — "Risa-chan"
 2017 — "The Last Disco Party"
 2018 — "There's Nothing I Want to Know Anymore" 
 2018 — "At Dawn" (Alyans cover)
 2019 — "Fall into the Mud"
 2019 — "Burn Burn Burn"

Collaborations 

 2016 — Noize MC — "Childfree"
 2016 — Khan Zamai & Slava KPSS — Hype Train («Гоша Рубчинский» feat. СД, Zoo in Space, Букер Д. Фред, Овсянкин, «Покемоны» feat. Овсянкин)
 2017 — Satana Pechet Bliny — "Selfie"
 2018 — Satana Pechet Bliny — "Son Studentki" 
 2018 — Noize MC, Swanky Tunes — "People with Machine Guns"
 2018 — Kurtki Cobaina — "DNA Threads" (Bi-2 and Monetochka)

Videos 

 2017 — "Left for a Realist"
 2017 — "Childfree" (feat. Noize MC)
 2017 — "Goodbye, my Yekaterinburg!"
 2017 — "The Last Disco Dance" 
 2018 — "Zaporozhets"
 2018 — "90"
 2018 —  "DNA Threads" (feat. Bi-2)
 2019 — "Nimphomaniac"
 2019 — "Fall into the Mud"
 2019 — "No Money"

References 

Pop rock musicians
Musicians from Yekaterinburg
21st-century Russian women singers
21st-century Russian singers
Russian women singer-songwriters
Living people
1998 births
Russian activists against the 2022 Russian invasion of Ukraine